Pyroderces klimeschi is a moth in the family Cosmopterigidae. It is found in Poland, the Czech Republic, Slovakia, Austria, Hungary, Romania and Italy.

The wingspan is 15–17 mm. The ground colour of the forewings is bright reddish brown, but this is hardly visible because of a chestnut brown wash. The hindwings are shining ashy grey. Adults have been recorded in May and June.

References

Moths described in 1938
klimeschi
Moths of Europe